Edley is an English surname. Notable people with the surname include:

Bill Edley (born 1948), American businessman and politician
Christopher Edley Jr. (born 1953), American law school dean
Joe Edley (born 1947), American professional Scrabble player and author

See also
Hedley (surname)